Madgul is a Mandal in Ranga Reddy district, Telangana, India. It is located 103 km from Mahabubnagar and 76 km from state headquarters Hyderabad. It is the home town of politician Jaipal Reddy who served as the member of legislative assembly from Kalwakurthy.

Villages

References

Mandals in Ranga Reddy district